Eremothera sculpturata is a species of windscorpion in the family Eremobatidae.

References

Further reading

 
 
 

Solifugae
Animals described in 1951